Arthur Edwin Shelton (August 15, 1853 – February 1, 1937) was the third mayor of the town of Calgary, Alberta.

Shelton came to Calgary around 1884 running a furniture business on Stephen Avenue. He served as town councillor during the mayoral tenure of George Clift King from 1886 to 1888.  Shelton was elected mayor in the 1888 election and served from January 16, 1888, to January 21, 1889. During his term, the Langevin Bridge was completed and the city begun construction of the waterworks system.

After his mayoral term, he returned to operate his furniture business. However, his name disappears from city directories in 1890.

Shelton's name appears in various corporate and government records in Vancouver, British Columbia, between 1892 and 1936.  He died on February 1, 1937.

External links
 City of Calgary Archives: Mayors

References 

1853 births
1937 deaths
Mayors of Calgary
19th-century Canadian politicians